Daniela Hantuchová was the defending champion, but she was defeated in the quarterfinals by Maria Sharapova.

Ana Ivanovic won the title, defeating Svetlana Kuznetsova in the final 6–4, 6–3.

Seeds
All seeds receive a bye into the second round.

Draw

Finals

Top half

Section 1

Section 2

Section 3

Section 4

Bottom half

Section 5

Section 6

Section 7

Section 8

References

External links
Draw and Qualifying Draw

2008 Pacific Life Open
Pacific Life Open